Princess Caroline Mathilde of Schleswig-Holstein-Sonderburg-Augustenburg (Viktoria Friederike Auguste Marie Caroline Mathilde; 25 January 1860 – 20 February 1932) was the second-eldest daughter of Frederick VIII, Duke of Schleswig-Holstein and his wife Princess Adelheid of Hohenlohe-Langenburg.

Family
Caroline Mathilde's elder sister, Augusta Viktoria was German Empress and Queen of Prussia as the wife of Wilhelm II, German Emperor. Karoline Mathilde was Duchess of Schleswig-Holstein-Sonderburg-Glücksburg and later Duchess of Schleswig-Holstein as the wife of Friedrich Ferdinand. Caroline's maternal grandmother Princess Feodora of Leiningen was the half-sister of Queen Victoria.

Marriage and issue
Caroline Mathilde married Friedrich Ferdinand, the eldest son of Friedrich, Duke of Schleswig-Holstein-Sonderburg-Glücksburg and Princess Adelheid of Schaumburg-Lippe and a nephew of Christian IX of Denmark, on 19 March 1885 at Primkenau. Friedrich Ferdinand and Caroline Mathilde had six children:

Princess Victoria Adelaide of Schleswig-Holstein-Sonderburg-Glücksburg (31 December 1885 – 3 October 1970)
Princess Alexandra Victoria of Schleswig-Holstein-Sonderburg-Glücksburg (21 April 1887 – 15 April 1957)
Princess Helena Adelaide of Schleswig-Holstein-Sonderburg-Glücksburg (1 June 1888 – 30 June 1962)
Princess Adelaide of Schleswig-Holstein-Sonderburg-Glücksburg (19 October 1889 – 11 June 1964)
Wilhelm Friedrich, Duke of Schleswig-Holstein (23 August 1891 – 10 February 1965)
Princess Karoline Mathilde of Schleswig-Holstein-Sonderburg-Glücksburg (11 May 1894 – 28 January 1972)

After the overthrow of the Hohenzollern dynasty at the end of World War I, Caroline and her family lived quietly, seldom seen outside Grünholz Castle.

Caroline died on 20 February 1932, aged 72,  at their castle. A few years previously, she had suffered an attack of heart disease and never completely recovered. Her husband was the only family member present on her deathbed.

Ancestry

References

|-

1860 births
1932 deaths
Karoline Mathilde
Karoline Mathilde
People from Augustenborg, Denmark
Karoline Mathilde